The MTV Video Music Award for Best Group (also known as the MTV Video Music Award for Best Group Video) is given to recording artists at the MTV Video Music Awards (VMAs). The award was introduced at the inaugural ceremony in 1984 by vocalist Ric Ocasek of  the Cars. American rock band ZZ Top was the first act to receive the honor for its "Legs" music video. Tim Newman, the video's director, accepted the award on behalf of the band.

In 2007, a revamp of the ceremony saw the award renamed from Best Group Video to simply Best Group. In 2008, the VMAs returned to their original format, but the award was not included. It was brought back for the 2019 edition of the show, as one of three social-media voted categories, instead of being determined by industry personnel as in previous years. In 2021, it was presented as Group of the Year.

BTS is the most-awarded artist in this category, having won the award four times, and is the only nominee to win the award in consecutive years, from 2019–2022. U2 is the most-nominated act, with seven of its videos receiving nominations in six different years between 1985 to 2005. TLC is the only girl group to win the award, doing so twice, with their videos for "Waterfalls" (1995) and "No Scrubs" (1999).

Recipients

See also
MTV Europe Music Award for Best Group
MTV Video Music Award Japan for Best Group Video

References 

MTV Video Music Awards
Awards established in 1984
Awards disestablished in 2007